The Church of Jesus Christ of Latter-day Saints in Germany refers to the Church of Jesus Christ of Latter-day Saints (LDS Church) and its members in Germany. 

The LDS Church reported 39,436 members in 2021. In 2010, nationwide active membership was estimated between 9,000 and 11,000, or 25-30% of total church membership.

History

1840s-1900 First missionaries and persecution

The first German to be converted to the LDS Church was an immigrant to the USA named Jakob Zundel in 1836.

Although one British Mormon convert had briefly worked in Germany, the first official of the church to arrive in Germany was Orson Hyde on 27 June 1841 as part of his journey to Palestine. He was delayed in Frankfurt by a visa problem and began to learn German. When he returned to Germany on his trip back from Palestine, he was in Regensburg from January to August 1842 and wrote "Ein Ruf aus der Wüste" ("A Cry out of the Wilderness") while there. It was published in Frankfurt and was the first LDS Church publication in the German language.

The first converts were baptized in Germany in 1851. Brigham Young sent Daniel Carn to establish the first German mission in 1852, which he did in Hamburg. Carn also oversaw the publication of a German-language version of the Book of Mormon which was published in Hamburg on 25 May 1852. He was eventually banished from Hamburg, then a sovereign state, due to his attempts to convert Germans to Mormonism but he continued to proselytise Germans in the then-Danish territory of Schleswig-Holstein.

Most early converts emigrated to the United States, depleting the local population of Latter-day Saints. In 1853, Prussia banned Mormonism and in 1854 the short-lived Hamburg branch was dissolved, with the German Mission closed in 1855. The church's involvement in Germany resumed in 1860 (under the auspices of various iterations of the Swiss Mission until the German Mission was reopened in 1898) but was limited due to persecution and the arrests of missionaries. Following German unification in 1871 some local areas of Germany became less restrictive towards missionary work and, in 1875, Joseph F. Smith declared that missionary work should recommence in Germany regardless of any opposition. This enabled a gradual increase in baptisms, with there being 280 LDS Church members in Germany in 1880 and conversions would average 300 a year over the next two decades.

1900-1945 Membership Growth and the Second World War

With increasing numbers of members, persecution began to increase as well (in 1903 Prussia and Mecklenburg both banished missionaries from their kingdoms) and in 1904 the German Mission was again closed and large scale missionary work wouldn't return until after World War I.

In the first half of the 20th century, Germany had more converts to Mormonism than any other non-English speaking country. By 1925 there were 6,125 members in the German-Austrian Mission, and 5,305 members in the Swiss-German Mission. The first German LDS meeting house was built in 1929 in Selbongen, East Prussia (now Zełwągi in Poland).

, 13,402 Mormons lived in the West German (including Austria as of November 1938) and East German Missions. Under the Nazi Government of 1933 - 1945, no Mormon congregation was stopped from worshipping and few individual Mormons were persecuted (and only for transgressions that any German of the time would have been punished for). Gestapo agents silently attended services, likely investigating neighbors' complaints of seditious activities, but no punishment came to the church. An estimated 3-5% of adult male members joined the Nazi Party—required of state employees—and speakers avoided criticizing the government or, after the German declaration of war against the United States, emphasizing the church's relationship with that country. The government ordered the church to avoid preaching about "Jewish" topics like "Zion" and "Israel", so leaders told members to not sing hymns with such words.

After Adolf Hitler took power, American Mormon missionaries' views of the government during the 1930s varied. While also praising Hitler's oratory skill and approving of his unifying a politically divided country, they saw arrests of dissidents, enforcement of Nazi eugenics, and widespread fear of the regime. The Nuremberg Laws increased access to and interest in genealogical records, and some saw the monthly eintopf as similar to Fast Sunday, but mandatory Hitler Youth membership ended most Mormon auxiliary organizations for young people. A few church members openly opposed the regime – Helmuth Hübener ended up being beheaded for anti-Nazi activities and his friend Karl-Heinz Schnibbe spent five years in a camp for his partbut their actions were motivated by BBC news reports of German defeats, not by LDS teachings. Hübener was the youngest opponent of Nazi Germany to be sentenced to death by the infamous Special People's Court (Volksgerichtshof) and executed.

At least 996 members were killed during World War II, including more than 400 adult men, about 10% of priesthood holders.

1946-2020s Cold War and the 21st Century

Following World War II, then Apostle Ezra Taft Benson arrived in Europe to organise aid for church members. He visited Germany many times, saw the terrible conditions people were living in and arranged aid shipments to offer some relief.

During the Cold War, members of the church in Germany found themselves divided among two nations. Members continued to maintain contact with the church in the west. In the fall of 1961 three stakes were created in Berlin (Germany's first), Stuttgart and Hamburg. In 1982, the Freiberg German Democratic Republic Stake was created. On June 19, 1985, the Freiberg GDR Temple was dedicated. It is the only temple to have been constructed in what was a communist bloc country. In 1987, the Frankfurt, West Germany Temple was dedicated.

Stakes
As of February 2023, the following stakes had congregations in Germany:

 *Stake centered outside of Germany with congregations in Germany.

Missions
Germany Berlin Mission
Germany Frankfurt Mission
Alpine German-speaking Mission (covers Austria, parts of Switzerland, and some of southern Germany)

Temples

See also

Religion in Germany

References

External links
Die anfange der Kirche Jesu Christi in Leipzig, MSS SC 1176 at L. Tom Perry Special Collections, Harold B. Lee Library, Brigham Young University
LDS Newsroom - Germany
The Church of Jesus Christ of Latter-day Saints (Germany) - Official Site
 ComeUntoChrist.org Latter-day Saints Visitor site
 FindeChristus.org

 
Christian denominations in Germany